Philotiella is a genus of "blue" (Polyommatinae) butterflies in the family Lycaenidae found in western North America.

Species
 Philotiella speciosa (H. Edwards, 1877) – small blue
 Philotiella leona (Hammond & McCorkle, 2000) - Leona's Blue

References

External links

Polyommatini
Lycaenidae genera